Pooh's Heffalump Movie (also known as The Heffalump Movie in the working title) is a 2005 American animated musical adventure comedy-drama film produced by the Japanese office of Disneytoon Studios and released by Walt Disney Pictures. Featuring characters from A. A. Milne's Winnie-the-Pooh stories, the film is the fourth theatrical animated film in Disney's Winnie the Pooh franchise and DisneyToon Studios's third adaptation of Winnie the Pooh stories, following The Tigger Movie (2000) and Piglet's Big Movie (2003). The film was released theatrically on February 11, 2005.

Plot
One day, Winnie the Pooh and his friends Piglet, Tigger, Roo, Rabbit and Eeyore hear a strange noise and find a set of large, circular footprints in the Hundred Acre Wood.  The friends believe that there is a strange creature known as a "heffalump" in the woods. Rabbit organizes an expedition to go try to catch it. Roo wants to come along, but the others tell him he is too young and small to go. Despite this, Roo slips out on his own in search of the heffalump. He finds one; a playful young creature named Heffridge Trumpler Brompet Heffalump IV—"Lumpy" for short. Roo is afraid of his captive at first but the two quickly become friends and play. Meanwhile, Rabbit and his friends enter Heffalump Hollow to find and capture the heffalump, Eeyore get left behind carrying all the supplies.

After a while, Lumpy hears his mother calling for him to come home. Roo wants Lumpy to meet all of his friends first, and they head towards the Hundred Acre Wood. Lumpy hesitates, thinking that the "creatures" that live there are scary, but Roo reassures him. Meanwhile, Pooh and his friends hear a noise in the forest, thinking it is the heffalump they run away but it turns out to be Eeyore who is left behind again. When Roo and Lumpy arrive, the Hundred Acre Wood is deserted, as everyone else is still out searching for the heffalump. Roo and Lumpy continue playing, making a mess of Pooh's house and Rabbit's garden. The two friends hear Lumpy's mother calling him again. They search for Lumpy's mother, but she is nowhere to be seen. Lumpy uses his trunk to call to her, but it does not work. After hours of searching, Lumpy assumes that they will never find her, and starts to cry. Roo consoles Lumpy with a song he learned from Kanga. Then, Roo gets an idea: they could go find his mother, and see if she can help Lumpy.

Meanwhile, the others return home to find Pooh's house and Rabbit's garden a mess. They conclude that the heffalump has invaded. When Lumpy and Roo are discovered, Rabbit thinks that Lumpy has captured Roo. He and the others chase Lumpy through the heffalump traps they set up earlier in the film. Lumpy evades the traps, but Roo gets caught in the last one as Lumpy escapes into the woods. Roo frees himself from the trap, and runs to find Lumpy trapped in a giant cage. Lumpy is upset and hurt, thinking that Roo has lied to him about the inhabitants of the Hundred Acre Wood being friendly. Roo tries to free Lumpy and apologizes for everything. Finally, Roo notices a rope at the top of the cage. He climbs up and unties it, freeing a very grateful Lumpy. Kanga, watching the two interact from behind a nearby tree, realizes that the heffalump is her son's friend.

Rabbit, Pooh, Tigger, and Piglet arrive and lasso Lumpy. Roo yells at them to stop. They refuse to listen, but Kanga tells them to have Roo explain himself. He tells the others that Heffalumps are not scary or mean. While Roo is explaining this, Lumpy stumbles and accidentally knocks Roo into a pile of giant, heavy logs forming a makeshift bridge over a ditch.

Lumpy and Roo's other friends try to rescue Roo, but the logs are too heavy for them to move. Lumpy gets an idea, and tries to call out to his mother. After a few tries, he finally gets it right. Lumpy's mother comes and tosses the logs aside, freeing Roo. Lumpy's mother is very proud that he has learned how to call out to her. Pooh explains to Rabbit why the heffalump was in their wood; she was only looking for her baby. They apologize for their misjudgment and befriend Lumpy and his mother. Roo and Lumpy get a little more time to play together before Lumpy has to go home.

During the credits, Eeyore finally catches up to Pooh and his friends and Lumpy has his adventures in the Hundred Acre Wood, including meeting Christopher Robin.

Cast

 Jim Cummings as Winnie-the-Pooh / Tigger
 John Fiedler as Piglet
 Peter Cullen as Eeyore
 Ken Sansom as Rabbit
 Kath Soucie as Kanga
 Nikita Hopkins as Roo
 Kyle Stanger as Lumpy the Heffalump
 Brenda Blethyn as Mama Heffalump

Production 
The film was originally intended as a direct-to-video release.

Heffalumps were first mentioned in the original Winnie-the-Pooh books. They appeared in a nightmare sequencealong with their fellow scary creatures, the woozlesin 1968's Winnie the Pooh and the Blustery Day. Though heffalumps and woozles have appeared in other Disney Pooh media, such as the New Adventures of Winnie the Pooh TV series, this was the first theatrical film to feature a "real" heffalump. Lumpy's design is similar to the heffalumps seen in the 1968 featurette and the song "The Horribly Hazardous Heffalumps!" is in the same style as "Heffalumps and Woozles" from Blustery Day. Carly Simon came up with Lumpy's full name, Heffridge Trumpler Brompet Heffalump, IV.

This was the final theatrically released film to feature voice actor John Fiedler as Piglet. It also marked the final Pooh film to be released in Fiedler's lifetime, as he died four months later from cancer.

This was also the final production of Walt Disney Animation Japan. Once the film was completed, Disney closed the studio in June 2004, eight months before the film's release.

Home media
Pooh's Heffalump Movie was released on DVD and VHS on May 24, 2005 in the United States. In the United Kingdom, the film was released on July 11, 2005, and later in a trilogy DVD on November 7, 2011, along with The Tigger Movie and Winnie the Pooh.

Music

American singer-songwriter Carly Simon wrote five new songs exclusively for the film and performed four of them ("Winnie the Pooh", "Little Mr. Roo", "Shoulder to Shoulder", and "In the Name of the Hundred Acre Wood"), while in "The Horribly Hazardous Heffalumps!" Simon is accompanied by Jim Cummings, Ken Sansom, John Fiedler, and Nikita Hopkins. "The Name Game" features Kyle Stanger and Nikita Hopkins as Lumpy and Roo.

Two songs from Simon's earlier soundtrack for Piglet's Big Movie are also included on the soundtrack, "Winnie the Pooh (Theme Song)" and "With A Few Good Friends", in which Simon is joined by her children Ben Taylor and Sally Taylor.

The soundtrack also features one instrumental track entitled "The Promise" by Joel McNeely, as well as seven classic Winnie The Pooh songs written by The Sherman Brothers.

Songs
Original songs performed in the film include:

Reception

Box office
The film made $5.8 million in its opening weekend, a per theater average of $2,296 from 2,529 theaters. The film ended up with a final gross of $18.1 million in North America and $34.8 million internationally, bringing the total worldwide gross to $52.9 million.

Critical response
Reviews were generally positive, resulting in a "Certified Fresh" rating of 80% on Rotten Tomatoes based on reviews from 89 critics with a 6.54/10 rating. The site's consensus states, "A charming and delightful walk through the Hundred Acres Woods for young viewers."

Sequel
A sequel, Pooh's Heffalump Halloween Movie, was released direct-to-video on September 13, 2005.

References

External links
 

 
 
 

2005 animated films
2005 films
2000s American animated films
2005 comedy-drama films
2005 fantasy films
2000s musical films
2000s English-language films
2000s buddy comedy films
American children's animated adventure films
American children's animated comedy films
American children's animated drama films
American children's animated fantasy films
American children's animated musical films
American comedy-drama films
Animated drama films
Animated musical films
Animated buddy films
Children's comedy-drama films
American animated feature films
Winnie the Pooh (franchise)
DisneyToon Studios animated films
Films scored by Joel McNeely
Animated films about elephants
Films with screenplays by Evan Spiliotopoulos
Walt Disney Pictures films
Winnie-the-Pooh films
Animated films about friendship
2000s children's animated films